Aporrectodea caliginosa (also known as Allolobophora similis or the grey worm) is an earthworm commonly found in Great Britain. Its saddle pads usually form a two humped ridge across three segments along the length of the saddle, however this is not clearly visible. The worm mostly lies in non-permanent horizontal burrows in topsoil, and is rarely found in leaf litter. Like most worms, its diet consists only of soil.

References 
Bart S, Amosse J, Lowe CN, Mougin C, Pery ARR, Pelosi C. Aporrectodea caliginosa, a relevant earthworm species for a posteriori pesticide risk assessment: current knowledge and recommendations for culture and experimental design. Environ Sci Pollut Res Int 2018. https://doi.org/10.1007/s11356-018-2579-9

https://www.opalexplorenature.org/grey-worm

Lumbricidae
Animals described in 1826